Lyndon Mustoe (born 30 January 1969) was a Welsh rugby union prop who was selected for the Wales national team on ten occasions during the 1990s.

Mustoe represented several Welsh club sides throughout his playing career, including Chepstow, Newport, Pontypool, Cardiff and Bridgend. In 1996 he was part of the Cardiff team that lost against Toulouse in the first Heineken Cup final.

References

1969 births
Living people
Rugby union players from Caerleon
Rugby union players from Newport, Wales
Rugby union props
Welsh rugby union players
Wales international rugby union players
Newport RFC players
Pontypool RFC players
Cardiff RFC players
Bridgend RFC players